History en Español is a 24-hour Spanish-language pay television channel, a counterpart of the History channel, that focuses on Latin American and world history. It officially launched in 2004 in the United States. The network shows original programming, as well as Spanish-dubbed versions of programs originally seen on the main, English-language, History channel.

External links
 
 Official Site

''

A&E Networks
Spanish-language television networks in the United States
Television channels and stations established in 2004